Alberto Gelacio Pérez Dayán (born December 13, 1960) is an Associate Justice of the Supreme Court of Justice of the Nation. President Felipe Calderon nominated him to the Supreme Court in 2010 and 2012, being elected by the Mexican Senate by a majority of 104 votes on December 3, 2012. He serves at the Second Chamber of the Court.

He attended Universidad La Salle, where he obtained his law degree in 1984. He holds a Masters and a Ph.D. Degree in Administrative Law by National Autonomous University of Mexico.

References 

1960 births
Living people
Supreme Court of Justice of the Nation justices
National Autonomous University of Mexico alumni